Malović is a surname. Notable people with the surname include:

Djurdjina Malović (born 1996), Montenegrin handball player
Miloš Malović (born 1989), Serbian footballer
Nikola Malović (born 1970), Serbian writer
Snežana Malović (born 1976), Serbian politician
Steve Malovic (1956–2007), American-Israeli basketball player

See also
Marica Malović-Đukić (born 1949), Serbian historian

Serbian surnames